Mohammad Waqas or Muhammad Waqas is Arabic male name and it can refer to:

 Mohammad Waqas (cricketer, born 1987), Pakistani cricketer
 Mohammad Waqas (cricketer, born 1988), Pakistani cricketer
 Mohammad Waqas (cricketer, born 1990), Pakistani cricketer
 Mohammad Waqas (cricketer, born 1993), Pakistani cricketer
 Muhammad Waqas (field hockey), Pakistani field hockey player